Civil Air Transport Flight 10 was a passenger flight from the now-closed Kai Tak Airport in Hong Kong to Songshan Airport in Taipei, Taiwan. The flight was operated by a Boeing 727-92C with registration B-1018 and named "Super Cuihua." On 16 February 1968, the aircraft crashed into a Hunan village in Linkou Township, Taipei County (now Linkou District, New Taipei City), killing 21 of the 63 people on board as well as one person on the ground. 42 people were injured.

Accident 
On the evening of 16 February 1968, B-1018 was flying from Hong Kong to Taipei Songshan Airport under the command of captain Stuart E. Dew, an unnamed first officer, and an unnamed flight engineer. Captain Hugh Hicks, the director of the airline's flight operations, was initially in the cockpit jumpseat, though Dew later let him perform the landing. Taipei's approach control cleared Flight 10 for an ILS approach and then transferred the flight to the tower control. The direction and heading of the plane were normal and the weather was clear. When Captain Hicks suddenly noticed that the aircraft's altitude had dropped too low, he pushed the throttles in an attempt to perform a go-around. As the plane touched ground, the cockpit voice recorder recorded him screaming: "Go to hell!" The aircraft then crashed into houses and burst into flames.

Firefighters and the United States military assisted to the rescue.

Investigation 

Taiwan's Civil Aeronautics Administration released the final report on 4 March. It concluded that the cause of the accident was due to pilot error, stating that:

 The aircraft functioned normally;
 Weather was normal;
 Pilots who landed at Songshan reported that the ILS was working;
 There were no communication problems with air traffic control.

Aftermath 
The 727 involved was leased from Southern Air Transport, and was Civil Air Transport's only aircraft that flew international routes. The crash resulted in the demise of the airline. International flights were taken over by China Airlines, and Civil Air Transport ceased operations in 1975.

Exactly 30 years after this accident, China Airlines Flight 676, a flight from Bali, Indonesia to Taipei, crashed in Dayuan Township, Taoyuan County, (now Dayuan District, Taoyuan City) killing 203 people (all 196 on board and seven more on the ground).

Changes 
Since the air traffic control radar at the time did not track the altitude of the aircraft, it was impossible to understand why Flight 10 suddenly dropped in altitude. It was only after the crash of Eastern Air Lines Flight 401 on 29 December 1972, in Miami, USA, that the Federal Aviation Administration began to introduce improved radar systems that displayed a flight's altitude.

References

External links 

 

Accidents and incidents involving the Boeing 727
History of New Taipei
Airliner accidents and incidents involving controlled flight into terrain
Aviation accidents and incidents in 1968
Airliner accidents and incidents caused by pilot error
Aviation accidents and incidents in Taiwan
1968 in Taiwan
Civil Air Transport accidents and incidents
1968 disasters in Taiwan